Mark A. Batzer is an American geneticist currently a LSU Boyd Professor at Louisiana State University and is an Elected Fellow of the American Association for the Advancement of Science.

References

Fellows of the American Association for the Advancement of Science
Louisiana State University faculty
American geneticists
Louisiana State University alumni
Michigan State University alumni
Living people
Year of birth missing (living people)